Baglana was a small Maratha Rashtrakuta kingdom of India that was situated on the main trade route between Surat and Daulatabad and Golkonda, with Burhanpur nearby. Over a period of many centuries up until 1637, the kingdom had paid a tribute to various Muslim rulers. In that year, Shah Jahan, the Mughal Emperor, placed his young son Aurangzeb in command of a force that successfully and easily annexed the lands. The territory was put under the administrative control of a Mughal faujdar as a part of Khandesh province. The erstwhile Raja of Baglana did not long survive the conquest and his successor converted to Islam.

References

Further reading

Rajput history
Mughal Empire